Berro is a surname. Notable people with the surname include:

Bernardo Berro (1803–1868), Uruguayan politician and President of Uruguay
Manfred Berro (born 1966), German slalom canoeist

See also
Isabelle Berro-Lefèvre (born 1965), Monegasque judge